Beth Katleman (born 1959 in Park Forest, Illinois) is an American artist known for porcelain assemblage sculpture cast from found objects. Her allegorical installations fall within the genre of pop surrealism, combining decorative elements, such as Rococo embellishments  and 19th century Toile de Jouy wallpaper scenery, with satirical references to consumer culture, fairy tales and classic literature. Katleman's work is in private and institutional collections and is exhibited internationally, including an installation commissioned by architect Peter Marino for Christian Dior, in the Hong Kong and London flagship boutiques. She lives and works in Brooklyn, New York, and is the recipient of the 2011 Moët Hennessey Prize, a Mid-Atlantic Arts Foundation grant, the Watershed Generation X Award, a Kohler Arts/Industry Fellowship and a residency in Cortona, Italy sponsored by the University of Georgia, Athens. Katleman holds a BA in English from Stanford University, an MFA from Cranbrook Academy of Art and an MBA in Arts Management from UCLA.

Influences 
Katleman's work addresses dualities between nature and culture; order and chaos; kitsch and fine art; dark humor and optimism; consumption and desire.  Her sculpture is informed by parallels and differences between classic European decorative arts and American pop culture. The objects that she casts into sculpture are sourced from dime store trinkets, gadgets, dolls and toys. Katleman is influenced by porcelain rooms, such as The Royal Palace of Aranjuez in Spain; Toile de Jouy wallpaper found in Versailles and the Victoria and Albert Museum; and time studying Italian porcelain reliefs in the Salottino di Porcellana room at the Royal Palace of Capodimonte, Naples, which she visited during an artist residency at the American Academy in Rome.

Her early work incorporated bright colored glazes, gold details and overt references to pop art. Katleman's work has been included in group exhibitions intended to blur distinctions between fine art and design. In 1998 a work from the toilet series, produced during her Kohler Arts/Industry Fellowship, was included in Bathroom at the Thomas Healy Gallery, alongside Andy Warhol and John Waters. In 2019 the Rhode Island School of Design Museum  invited Katleman to create a site-specific installation in response to the 1969 exhibition Raid the Icebox I with Andy Warhol.

In 2010 Katleman transitioned to working entirely in white porcelain, often installed as sculptural tableaus to produce a three-dimensional wall paper effect. Literature, in particular classical mythology and fairy tales, also inspires the work.

Process 
Katleman fabricates her sculptures using hand cast porcelain objects that are combined into a singular composition and kiln fired without a glaze to produce a matte white surface. A completed installation can contain up to 3,500 individual cast elements. The molds used to produce the castings are made after combinations of source materials are experimented with, using digital imaging software and hand drawn renderings. These 2D compositions are then used to visualize placement while working with figures from her studio library of objects.

Exhibitions 
Raid the Icebox Now, RISD Museum, Providence, Rhode Island
2018- Strange Arcadia, Spagnuolo Art Gallery, Georgetown University, Washington D.C.
2017- Confabulations of Millennia, Institute of Contemporary Art, Portland, Maine
2016- Unconventional Clay, Nelson-Atkins Museum of Art, Kansas City, Missouri
2016- Contemporary Clay: A Survey of Contemporary American Ceramics, Western Carolina University Fine Arts Museum, Cullowee, North Carolina
2015- Tchotchke: Mass-Produced Sentimental Objects in Contemporary Art, The Gund Gallery, Gambier, Ohio
2011- Flora and Fauna: MAD about Nature, Museum of Art and Design, New York, New York
2011- Folly, Jane Hartsock Gallery, New York, New York
2011- Pavilion of Art and Design, New York, New York, London, England and Paris, France, Todd Merrill Studio Contemporary
2009- Selections from the Kohler Company Collection, 798 ArtZone, Beijing, China New Works/Old Story, Contemporary Jewish Museum, San Francisco, California
2008- The Diane and Sandy Besser Collection, M.H. de Young Museum, San Francisco, California
2000- Blown Away, Garth Clark Gallery, New York, New York
1998- Bathroom, Thomas Healy Gallery, New York, New York, curated by Wayne Koestenbaum
1996- The Pull of Beauty, Storefront for Art and Architecture, New York and the National Building Museum, Washington, D.C., curated by Kiki Smith and Victoria Milne
1994- Artists from the Archie Bray Foundation, Holter Museum of Art, Helena, Montana and University of Washington Art Gallery, Seattle, Washington

Collections 

Nike, United States
M. H. de Young Museum, San Francisco, California
Christian Dior Boutique, London
Christian Dior, Hong Kong
Ci Kim Arario Gallery Collection, South Korea
John Michael Kohler Arts Center, Sheboygan, Wisconsin
Kohler Company Collection, Kohler, Wisconsin
Archie Bray Foundation, Helena, Montana
Right Management, Philadelphia, Pennsylvania
Rhode Island School of Design Museum, Rhode Island
Kamm Teapot Foundation, Sparta, North Carolina

References 

Living people
1959 births
Sculptors from Illinois
People from Park Forest, Illinois
20th-century American women artists
21st-century American women artists
American contemporary artists
American women sculptors
American women ceramists
American ceramists
Stanford University alumni
Cranbrook Academy of Art alumni
University of California, Los Angeles alumni